Kristine Samuelson is a documentary filmmaker and the Edward Clark Crossett Emerita Professor of Humanistic Studies at Stanford University. Her film, Life Overtakes Me (2020), made with John Haptas, was nominated for an Oscar for best short-subject documentary, for the 92nd Academy Awardshaving premiered at the Sundance Film Festival. It also received Audience Awards at the Full Frame and Chicago Critics Film Festivals.

References

External links
 

Living people
American documentary film directors
American women film directors
American women documentary filmmakers
Stanford University Department of Art and Art History faculty
Year of birth missing (living people)